HKH may refer to:
 HKH Ranges, or the Hindu Kush-Himalayan Region
 Hawkhead railway station, in Scotland
 HKH General Contracting, founded by Hamad bin Khalid Al Thani